The 1992 Wimbledon Championships was a tennis tournament played on grass courts at the All England Lawn Tennis and Croquet Club in Wimbledon, London in the United Kingdom. It was the 106th edition of the Wimbledon Championships and were held from 22 June to 5 July 1992.

Prize money
The total prize money for 1992 championships was £4,416,820. The winner of the men's title earned £265,000 while the women's singles champion earned £240,000.

* per team

Champions

Seniors

Men's singles

 Andre Agassi defeated  Goran Ivanišević, 6–7(8–10), 6–4, 6–4, 1–6, 6–4
 It was Agassi's 1st career Grand Slam title.

Women's singles

 Steffi Graf defeated  Monica Seles, 6–2, 6–1
 It was Graf's 11th career Grand Slam title and her 4th Wimbledon title.

Men's doubles

 John McEnroe /  Michael Stich defeated  Jim Grabb /  Richey Reneberg, 5–7, 7–6(7–5), 3–6, 7–6(7–5), 19–17
 It was McEnroe's 17th and last career Grand Slam title and his 8th Wimbledon title. It was Stich's 2nd and last career Grand Slam title and his 2nd Wimbledon title.

Women's doubles

 Gigi Fernández /  Natasha Zvereva defeated  Larisa Neiland /  Jana Novotná, 6–4, 6–1
 It was Fernández's 5th career Grand Slam title and her 1st Wimbledon title. It was Zvereva's 6th career Grand Slam title and her 2nd Wimbledon title.

Mixed doubles

 Cyril Suk /  Larisa Neiland defeated  Jacco Eltingh /  Miriam Oremans, 7–6(7–2), 6–2
 It was Suk's 2nd career Grand Slam title and his 1st Wimbledon title. It was Neiland's 3rd career Grand Slam title and her 2nd Wimbledon title.

Juniors

Boys' singles

 David Škoch defeated  Brian Dunn, 6–4, 6–3

Girls' singles

 Chanda Rubin defeated  Laurence Courtois, 6–2, 7–5

Boys' doubles

 Steven Baldas /  Scott Draper defeated  Mahesh Bhupathi /  Nitin Kirtane, 6–1, 4–6, 9–7

Girls' doubles

 Maija Avotins /  Lisa McShea defeated  Pam Nelson /  Julie Steven, 2–6, 6–4, 6–3

Invitation

Gentlemen's invitation doubles
 Peter Fleming /  Stan Smith defeated  Mark Edmondson /  Kim Warwick, 6–7, 7–6, 6–4

Ladies' invitation doubles

 Wendy Turnbull /  Virginia Wade defeated  Rosie Casals /  Sharon Walsh-Pete, 3–6, 6–3, 7–5

Senior gentlemen's invitation doubles
 Marty Riessen /  Sherwood Stewart defeated  John Newcombe /  Tony Roche, 3–6, 6–3, 6–3

Singles seeds

Men's singles
  Jim Courier (third round, lost to Andrei Olhovskiy)
  Stefan Edberg (quarterfinals, lost to Goran Ivanišević)
  Michael Stich (quarterfinals, lost to Pete Sampras)
  Boris Becker (quarterfinals, lost to Andre Agassi)
  Pete Sampras (semifinals, lost to Goran Ivanišević)
  Petr Korda (second round, lost to Jakob Hlasek)
  Michael Chang (first round, lost to Jeremy Bates)
  Goran Ivanišević (final, lost to Andre Agassi)
  Guy Forget (quarterfinals, lost to John McEnroe)
  Ivan Lendl (fourth round, lost to Goran Ivanišević)
  Richard Krajicek (third round, lost to Arnaud Boetsch)
  Andre Agassi (champion)
  Brad Gilbert (third round, lost to Wally Masur)
  Wayne Ferreira (fourth round, lost to Boris Becker)
  Alexander Volkov (third round, lost to Henrik Holm)
  David Wheaton (third round, lost to John McEnroe)

Women's singles
  Monica Seles (final, lost to Steffi Graf)
  Steffi Graf (champion)
  Gabriela Sabatini (semifinals, lost to Steffi Graf)
  Martina Navratilova (semifinals, lost to Monica Seles)
  Arantxa Sánchez Vicario (second round, lost to Julie Halard)
  Jennifer Capriati (quarterfinals, lost to Gabriela Sabatini)
  Mary Joe Fernández (third round, lost to Amy Frazier)
  Conchita Martínez (second round, lost to Natasha Zvereva)
  Manuela Maleeva-Fragnière (third round, lost to Kristin Godridge)
  Anke Huber (third round, lost to Yayuk Basuki)
  Jana Novotná (third round, lost to Patty Fendick)
  Katerina Maleeva (quarterfinals, lost to Martina Navratilova)
  Zina Garrison (fourth round, lost to Natasha Zvereva)
  Nathalie Tauziat (quarterfinals, lost to Monica Seles)
  Kimiko Date (second round, lost to Gigi Fernández)
  Judith Wiesner (third round, lost to Naoko Sawamatsu)

References

External links
 Official Wimbledon Championships website

 
Wimbledon Championships
Wimbledon Championships
June 1992 sports events in the United Kingdom
July 1992 sports events in the United Kingdom